D-class cruiser can refer to either of the following:

 , a series of British light cruisers that served during World War II
 , a pair of planned large cruisers designed as part of Plan Z